Prasophyllum nitidum, commonly known as the shining leek orchid, is a species of orchid endemic to southern continental Australia. It has a single tube-shaped leaf and up to twenty maroon, magenta or purple and green flowers with a pale purple to maroon labellum. It is a recently described plant, previously included with P. fitzgeraldii, but distinguished from that species by its shorter flower spike, glossy flowers and shining, raised labellum callus. It grows in the south-east of South Australia and in a single location in western Victoria.

Description
As with others in the genus, the flowers are inverted so that the labellum is above the column rather than below it. The upturned part is wavy or crinkled with hair-like papillae on the edges. There is a raised, oblong to egg-shaped, shiny callus which is darker than the labellum and which is in the centre of the labellum and extending almost to its tip. Flowering occurs in late September and October.

Taxonomy and naming
Prasophyllum nitidum was first formally described in 2017 by David Jones and Robert Bates and the description was published in Australian Orchid Review from a specimen collected in the Desert Camp Conservation Park. The specific epithet (nitidum) is a Latin word meaning "shining", "glittering" or "bright", referring to the shiny flowers.

Distribution and habitat
The shining leek orchid mostly grows in woodland on fertile plains in the mid to upper south-east of South Australia and near Edenhope in far western Victoria.

References

External links 
 

nitidum
Flora of South Australia
Flora of Victoria (Australia)
Plants described in 2017
Endemic orchids of Australia